The Yetties (John "Bonny" Sartin, Pete Shutler, and Mac McCulloch) were an English folk music group, who took their name from the Dorset village of Yetminster, their childhood home. In 1975, they released an album entitled The Yetties of Yetminster. The Yetties retired in 2011.

History

There are two ex-members: Bob Common and Roger Trim. The former left during the 1970s, to spend more time with his family. Until Trim joined, The Yetties then operated as a trio. Trim introduced fiddle-playing to the group, and their sound changed somewhat during his stay. Since the latter's departure, The Yetties have again operated as a trio. Sartin was lead singer and group-compere, addressing the audience more than the other two. However, his colleagues both led some songs and both joked with the audience. Shutler played keyboard, though mainly he was a very accomplished accordion player, inspired by the playing of Scotland's Jimmy Shand; McCulloch played guitar and banjo.

Since turning professional in 1967, their music took them from Dorset all over the UK; appearing extensively in Europe and, under the auspices of the British Council, they performed successfully in many countries, including Thailand, Nepal, Sri Lanka, Malaysia, Hong Kong, Singapore, Pakistan, Sudan, India, Bangladesh, the Maldives, the Philippines, Ethiopia and Canada. One of the secrets of their success, and way of breaking down language barriers, has been their knack of audience participation.

Over the years they recorded 45 albums (on various labels). Most of these were a mixture of songs, instrumental folk-dance music and poetry. They also undertook topic-based projects. The Dorset writer, Thomas Hardy, was also a musician; he and his family, over several generations, collected hundreds of folk tunes. The Yetties made two recordings on Thomas Hardy's own fiddle and other Hardy family instruments. Another Yetties' projects involved recording a collection of songs and stories about cricketers of the past with John Arlott.

The Yetties broadcast a regular BBC Radio 2 series, Cider & Song. They also made numerous other radio and television appearances. They were often asked back to locations, becoming regular performers at various annual events, including the Farnham Beer Exhibition and many more.

The Yetties lived in Sherborne (a few miles from Yetminster) and drew on their personal experiences of country life for their concert programmes. Some songs recalled life when they were children, helping farmers harvest; scrumping apples; raiding hedges, fields and woods for food and eating rabbit for seemingly every meal. They talked of village characters and village occasions, conveying an atmosphere of bygone village society.

Retirement
The Yetties announced their retirement in early 2010, and their final performance was a ceilidh and concert at Sherborne in April 2011.

On the evening of 21 September 2014, it was announced on the official Yetties website that Pete Shutler had died in Sherborne Hospital. Mac McCulloch passed away on December 15th 2021.

Album discography
Fifty Stone of Loveliness (1969)
Who's A-fear'd? (1970)
Keep A-Runnin' - It's The Yetties! (1970)
Our Friends, The Yetties (1971)
Dorset Is Beautiful (1972)
All at Sea (1973)
Up in Arms (1974)
Let's Have A Party (1975)
The World of the Yetties (1975)
The Yetties of Yetminster (1975)
The World of The Yetties (1975) (compilation LP)
The Village Band (1976)
Upmarket (1977)
Dorset Style (1978)
Focus on The Yetties (1978) (compilation LP)
In Concert (1979)
A Little Bit of Dorset (1981)
A Proper Job (1981)
Folk N Brass (1982)
On the Fiddle (1982)
Cider 'n' Song (1983)
The Banks of Newfoundland (1984)
The Sound of Cricket (1984)
The Musical Heritage of Thomas Hardy (single cassette) (1985)
The Yetties (1986)
The Musical Heritage of Thomas Hardy (double LP) (1988)
Play it Again (1989)
Singing All The Way (1989)
Out in the Green Fields (1990)
The Fiddler Knows (1990)
Looking for the Sunshine (1991)
Come to the Yetties' Barn Dance (1992)
Dorset, My Dorset (1993)
Singalong Party 'Cigarettes & Whisky & Wild Wild Singing''' (1995)Top of the Crops (1995)Folk Music of England (1997)In Praise of Dorset (1997)Wild Mountain Thyme (1999)Musical Allsorts (2000)Rolling Home To England (2001)Messing About on the River (2003)Rambleaway'' (2005)

References

External links
The Yetties' Official website
Scrumpy and Western website

English folk musical groups
English folk musicians
Scrumpy and Western
People from Yetminster